This is a list of cities, towns, villages, parishes and hamlets in County Londonderry, Northern Ireland. See the list of places in Northern Ireland for places in other counties.

Towns are listed in bold.

A
Aberfoyle
Aghadowey 
Altnagelvin
Ardgarvan
Ardmore
Articlave
Artikelly

B
Ballerin
Ballinascreen
Ballinderry 
Ballyhanedin
Ballykelly
Ballylifford
Ballymaguigan
Ballynagalliagh
Ballyrashane
Ballyronan
Ballyrory
Ballysally
Ballyscullion
Banagher
Bellaghy
Bellarena
Benone
Bogside
Burnfoot

C
CARNHILL SA
Campsey
Carrowclare
Castledawson
Castlerock
Clady
Claudy
Coagh
Coleraine
Creagh
Culmore
Culnady
Curran

D
Derry (has city status)
Derrynaflaw
Desertmartin
Downhill
Draperstown
Drumahoe
Drummullan
Drumraighland
Drumsurn
Dungiven

E
Eglinton
Elagh More
Errigal

F
Feeny
Foreglen

G
Garvagh
Glack
Glenone
Glenullin
Gortnahey
Goshedan
Greysteel
Gulladuff

I
Inishrush

K
Killaloo
Killywool
Kilrea
Kilcronaghan
Knockloughrim

L
Largy
Lavey
Lenamore
Lettershendoney
Limavady
Lisbunny
Lissan
The Loup

M
Macosquin
Maghera
Magherafelt
Magilligan
Maydown
Moneymore
Moneyneany

N
Newbuildings
Nixon's Corner

P
Park
Portstewart
Prehen

R
Ringsend

S
Shanvey
Straidarran
Strathfoyle
Straw
Swatragh

T
Tamlaght 
Tamnaherin
Tobermore
Traad

U
Upperlands

See also 
 List of townlands in County Londonderry
 List of civil parishes of County Londonderry

Places
Londonderry
Places